The glaciers and ice caps of Iceland cover 11% of the land area of the country (about 11,400 km² out of the total area of 103,125 km²) and have a considerable impact on its landscape and meteorology. Glaciers are also contributing to the Icelandic economy, with tourists flocking to the country to see glaciers on snowmobiles and on glacier hiking tours. However, the recent loss of ice due to climate change is an increasing concern in Icelandic society.

Description 
An ice cap is a mass of glacial ice that covers less than 50,000 km² of land area covering a highland area and they feed outlet glaciers. Many Icelandic ice caps and glaciers lie above volcanoes, such as Grímsvötn and Bárðarbunga, which lie under the largest ice cap, Vatnajökull. The caldera of Grímsvötn is 100 km² in area, and Bárðarbunga is 60 km².

When volcanic activity occurs under the glacier, the resulting meltwater can lead to a sudden glacial lake outburst flood, known in Icelandic as jökulhlaup, but jökulhlaups are most often caused by accumulation of meltwater due to geothermal activity underneath the glacier. Such jökulhlaups have occasionally triggered volcanic eruptions through the sudden release of pressure.

The glaciers are relevant enough in Icelandic geography that the four largest are represented blank in most of the maps of the administrative divisions of Iceland smaller than the regions.

Iceland is losing ice due to climate change. Okjökull in Borgarfjörður, West Iceland, has lost its glacier title and is now simply known as Ok, losing the Icelandic word for glacier, jökull, as a suffix. In order to fit the criteria glaciers need to be thick enough to sink and move under their own weight, which Okjökull is not. Okjökull is the first Icelandic glacier to lose its title.

Largest glaciers by surface area

These 13 largest glaciers have an aggregate area of 11,181 km² (out of about 11,400 km² for all glaciers of Iceland).

See also
 Geography of Iceland
 List of glaciers

References

External links
 National Land Survey of Iceland : Icelandic Statistics (Original source of area figures)
 Elevations of some glaciers
 Geographic Names of Iceland's Glaciers: Historic and Modern

Glaciers
Iceland